Wichradz  is a village in the administrative district of Gmina Warka, within Grójec County, Masovian Voivodeship, in east-central Poland.

The village has a population of 220.

References

Wichradz